The following is a list of railroads operating in the U.S. Commonwealth of Puerto Rico.

Current railroads

Passenger systems
 Tren Urbano

Planned systems
 San Juan-Caguas Rail –  (Postponed, originally planned for Q1 2010.)
 Hatillo-Bayamón Rail –  (Under Construction. Scaled back to bus rapid transit.)

Defunct railroads

 Línea Férrea del Oeste
 Compañía de los Ferrocarriles de Puerto Rico
 American Railroad Company of Puerto Rico 
 Compañía de Ferrocarriles de Vía Estrecha de Mayagüez
 Fajardo Development Railroad
 Luce & Co. Railroad
 Humacao Railroad
 Northern Railroad of Porto Rico
 Ponce and Guayama Railroad
 Ponce Light Company Railroad
 Porto Rico Railroad and Transportation Company
 Porto Rico Railway, Light and Power Company
 Roig Railroad
 San Juan and Carolina Railroad
 Vega Alta Railroad

Tourist railways
 Safari Park, Vega Alta in Vega Alta, Puerto Rico
 Divertilandia in Humacao, Puerto Rico
 Ferrocarril Histórico in Fajardo, Puerto Rico
 El Parque del Tren in Bayamon, Puerto Rico
 Train of the South in Arroyo, Puerto Rico

Industrial railways
 Mona Island Tramway
 Railway of the Blanco River Hydroelectric System in Naguabo, Puerto Rico

Central short-lines

 Central Aguirre
 Central Boca Chica
 Central Cambalache
 Central Canovanas
 Central Carmen
 Central Coloso
 Central Constancia
 Central Cortada
 Central Defensa
 Central Ejemplo
 Central Eureka
 Central Fortuna
 Central Guánica
 Central Juanita
 Central Juncos
 Central Lafayette
 Central Los Canos
 Central Machete
 Central Mercedita
 Central Monserrate
 Central Pasto Viejo
 Central Plata
 Central Plazuela
 Central Rochelaise
 Central Rufina
 Central San Francisco
 Central San Vicente
 Central Santa Juana
 Central Triunfo
 Central Vannina
 Central Victoria

Street railways
 Caguas Tramway
 San Juan Light and Transit Company
 Tranvía de la Capital
 Tranvía de Ubarri
 Trolley de San Juan
 Mayagüez Tramway
 Ponce Tramway

See also
 List of United States railroads
 Rail transport in Puerto Rico
 Transportation in Puerto Rico

References

 The Tramways of San Juan

External links
 Ponce, PR railroads
 Ponce, PR trains

 
Rail transport in Puerto Rico
Lists of railroads by US state
Railroads